Fuat Avni was an anonymous Twitter phenomenon, mostly known for tweets and leaks concerning the Justice and Development Party. The account tweeted its first tweet on 18 April 2014, and as of March 2021 it had 2.0 million followers.

Claims on its identity 
As of May 2016, it is unknown who they are. Different people have occasionally claimed to be them, however none of these claims were proven.

On 20 July 2016, computer engineer Akif Mustafa Koçyiğit was arrested in İstanbul with other 9 engineers within the scope of 2016 purges following the coup d'état attempt. They were charged for providing information to Fuat Avni. On 24 July, Muhammed Sait Kuloğlu and Yetkin Yıldız were also arrested.

Contents of its claims 
It claimed to provide information from undisclosed government talks concerning the 2013 corruption scandal, irregularities during elections, secret operations with the government and Cemaat. The account generally referred to Recep Tayyip Erdoğan as "BB" (Turkish for PM), "Tiran" (tyrant), "Başçalan" (a pun on PM, meaning Prime Thief), "Yezid" (Yazid I, the second Umayyad Caliph, known as a tyrant by some scholars), "Faşist" (fascist) or Narsist (narcissist). They used Bediüzzaman's iconic "Korkma, titre" phrase ("Don't be afraid, shiver") occasionally.

Important claims 
Some of their claims had been realized a few days or week later.

Accounts 
Due to legal actions, the account name has changed twice.

See also 
Pelican files
Government of Turkey

References 

Twitter accounts
Internet memes
Turkish political people